Marion Sicot (born 24 June 1992) is a French racing cyclist, who is suspended from the sport until 2024, following a positive test for erythropoietin (EPO). She finished ninth at the 2014 Grand Prix de Plumelec-Morbihan Dames and seventh at the 2015 Grand Prix de Plumelec-Morbihan Dames.

Sanctions
In September 2019, Sicot was announced to have tested positive for erythropoietin (EPO). Sicot tested positive for EPO in a test carried out by the AFLD – the Agence Française de Lutte contre le Dopage – at the French National Time Trial Championships on 27 June 2019 and was provisionally suspended on 18 July 2019. She was handed a two-year suspension by the AFLD, a decision made by its Sanctions Commission on 16 December 2020. This ban was extended to four years in March 2022.

References

External links

1992 births
Living people
French female cyclists
Doping cases in cycling
Sportspeople from Orléans
Cyclists from Centre-Val de Loire